Rocket Mortgage, LLC (formerly known as Quicken Loans LLC) is a mortgage loan provider. It is headquartered in the One Campus Martius building in the financial district of Downtown Detroit, Michigan. In January 2018, the company became the largest overall retail lender in the U.S. (it is also the largest online retail mortgage lender). Unlike other large mortgage lenders that depend on deposits, Rocket Mortgage relies on wholesale funding to make its loans and uses online applications rather than a branch system. Amrock and One Reverse Mortgage are also part of the Rocket Mortgage Family of Companies. The company closed more than $400 billion of mortgage volume across all 50 states from 2013 through 2017.

History
Rock Financial was founded in 1985 by Dan Gilbert, Ron Berman, Lindsay Gross, and Gary Gilbert. In May 1998, Gilbert took Rock Financial public, launching an IPO underwritten by Bear Stearns.

The company started to change course in the late 1990s, shifting from a traditional mortgage provider to an online-focused lender. Traditionally, the home mortgage business in America has been fragmented due to varying regulations in each state and locality. Gilbert challenged this orthodoxy, however, by offering loan applications online that were reviewed by experts versed in the regulations of each region but who were located in a central headquarters.

Quicken Loans
In December 1999, a year and a half after the IPO, Intuit Inc. (makers of QuickBooks, TurboTax, and Quicken) purchased Rock Financial Corp. for $532M. The company was renamed Quicken Loans.

In June 2002, two and a half years after selling the company, Dan Gilbert led a small group of private investors in purchasing the Quicken Loans subsidiary back from Intuit for $64M.

In 2004, Quicken Loans became a defendant in a class action lawsuit. This was filed against the company on behalf of employees who had worked as loan consultants for any Quicken office within the past three years. The claimants alleged that Quicken violated the Fair Labor Standards Act (FLSA) by failing to pay the plaintiffs overtime for working beyond a 40-hour work week. Quicken Loans denied these claims, and said it is not aware of any such violations of the FLSA. On March 17, 2011, a federal jury found in favor of Quicken Loans, ending the seven-year-old lawsuit. The decision means that Quicken Loans is not obligated to pay overtime payments to the plaintiffs.

In August 2007, the entire mortgage industry faced a crisis in obtaining new credit from banking institutions and hedge funds. In response, Quicken Loans discontinued:
 Second mortgages
 Home equity lines of credit (HELOC)
 Alt-A products
 Deferred interest loans

On November 12, 2007, Gilbert announced a development agreement with the city of Detroit to move the company headquarters downtown, consolidating suburban offices. The construction sites reserved for development by the agreement included the location of the former Statler Hotel on Grand Circus Park and the former Hudson's location. Quicken Loans moved into its downtown headquarters in August 2010. The initial move brought 1,700 employees to the city.

In the spring of 2008, Rock Holdings entered the reverse mortgage market with the acquisition of One Reverse Mortgage.

The company saw a small drop in employment levels following the 2008 financial crisis.

Since 2009, Quicken has been headquartered at One Campus Martius facing Campus Martius Park in Detroit. The company also houses its employees in Downtown Detroit's First National Building, The Qube, Chrysler House, One Woodward Avenue, and 1001 Woodward, all owned by Quicken Loans' parent company, Rock Ventures.

In 2014, Quicken Loans grew to be the 2nd largest mortgage lender in the United States, and remains the nation's largest online mortgage lender. The company employs 24,000 people nationwide, with approximately 17,000 now working in the city of Detroit, making it Detroit's largest employer, minority employer, and taxpayer.

In January 2018, Quicken Loans became the nation's largest mortgage lender.

In August 2018, Quicken Loans parent Rock Holding acquired Dictionary.com and Thesaurus.com from IAC.

On October 15, Quicken Loans announced that it was expanding into Canada by opening a tech center across the river in downtown Windsor, Ontario.

Quicken Loans has consistently been awarded the highest customer satisfaction rating among primary mortgage originators the U.S. for 10 straight years, as well as being one of top 20 companies to work for and a top pick for overall best mortgage lenders, according to Consumers Advocate.

On July 7, 2020, it was announced that Quicken Loans had filed paperwork with the U.S. Securities and Exchange Commission to start the process of taking the company public under the name Rocket Companies.

On August 6, 2020, Rocket Companies, Inc. went public under the symbol RKT, raising $1.8 billion.

For the year ended 2020, Quicken Loans originated over 1.1 million loans valued at $313 billion, these figures are almost twice that of the next largest lender in the U.S., United Wholesale Mortgage, which is also headquartered near Detroit.

On May 12, 2021 Quicken Loans announced that it would be rebranded to Rocket Mortgage, by July 31, 2021.

Rocket Mortgage
In 2015, Quicken Loans created Rocket Mortgage, the first lender to perform electronic closings (eClosings) in all 50 states. Upon launch, TechCrunch claimed it was the mortgage industry's “iPhone moment” and compared the application process to TurboTax. Rocket owns three patents around verifying client data, filtering it and sourcing it, and extracting it from external parties. In 2019, it filed another patent for data set selection using multi-source constraints. The most recent patent was filed in October 2020 regarding extracting data sets from external data stores.

In its first full year, Rocket funded $7 billion in closed loans. J.D. Power named Rocket Mortgage #1 in the nation for client satisfaction in primary mortgage origination in 2020, the 11th consecutive year either Rocket Mortgage or Quicken Loans earned the recognition. As of 2021, Rocket subsidiary Amrock has fulfilled more than 1 million digital mortgage closings.

Rocket sponsors the Rocket Mortgage FieldHouse, an arena located in downtown Cleveland, Ohio. It is the home of the Cleveland Cavaliers of the National Basketball Association (NBA) and the Cleveland Monsters of the American Hockey League. The arena, formerly known as the Quicken Loans Arena, changed its name to the Rocket Mortgage FieldHouse after the completion of the arena's renovation and expansion in 2019.

Rocket Mortgage has launched several initiatives that support its home communities of Detroit, Cleveland, Charlotte, and Phoenix, including veteran homelessness and digital literacy.

See also

 Rocket Mortgage FieldHouse – A multi-purpose arena in Downtown Cleveland, Ohio.
 Suburban Collection Showplace (previously known as the Rock Financial Showplace) – A convention center in Novi, Michigan

References

External links

 Quicken Loans

Companies based in Detroit
American companies established in 1985
Financial services companies established in 1985
Financial services companies of the United States
Mortgage lenders of the United States
Rock Ventures
Companies listed on the New York Stock Exchange
1985 establishments in Michigan
2020 initial public offerings